Skene may refer to:
 Skene, Aberdeenshire, a community in North East Scotland, United Kingdom
 Skene, Mississippi, an unincorporated community in Mississippi, United States
 Skene, Sweden, a village now part of Kinna, Sweden
 Skene (automobile), an American steam automobile manufactured by Skene American Automobile Company from 1900 to 1901
 Skene Boats, Canadian manufacturer
 Skene (theatre), a part of a classical Greek theatre
 Clan Skene, a Lowland Scottish clan
 Skene! Records, a record label based in Minneapolis, Minnesota
 Skene (TV film), a 2004 Finnish television film

People with the surname
Skene (surname)

See also
 Skene's glands, glands on the anterior wall of the vagina in human anatomy